Radisson is a small unconstituted locality situated near the Robert-Bourassa hydroelectric power station on the La Grande River in the James Bay region of Quebec, Canada. Geographically, Radisson is located halfway between the southern and northernmost points in Quebec and is, besides Schefferville, the only non-native town north of the 53rd parallel in this province.

Despite its remoteness, Radisson has plenty of services for its residents and travellers: two fuel stations, hotel, motel, campground (summer only), a general store, restaurants, gift shops, a school and a hospital. It is also home to a huge Hydro-Québec employee facility, from where guided tours to the Robert-Bourassa power station start.  It also houses employees of Air Inuit who are stationed at La Grande Rivière Airport.

To the East is the Trans-Taiga Road (French: Route Transtaïga) that leads to the Caniapiscau Reservoir and the former construction camp of Caniapiscau (now used by a wilderness outfitter).

History
Radisson was founded in 1974 to accommodate workers for the James Bay hydroelectric project and named by the Société de développement de la Baie James after Pierre-Esprit Radisson, a 17th-century French explorer and founder of the Hudson's Bay Company. During the peak construction period in 1977, its population reached about 2,500 and has fluctuated since that time. Currently it is a community of about 300 people. The main employer is Hydro-Québec and its main subsidiary, the Société de l'énergie de la Baie James. Many locals are also employed in the tourism/hospitality industry that caters especially to the outdoor sports, such as hunting, fishing, and camping.

Radisson, also referred to on some unofficial maps as "La Grande", is part of the Municipality of Baie-James which covers most of the territory of James Bay region, with the exception of the Cree villages as well as towns of Chapais, Chibougamau, Matagami and Lebel-sur-Quévillon, all of which are enclaves.

The town is accessible by road from Matagami,  to the south. The road is known as the James Bay Road (French: Route de la Baie James) and was built during the construction of the James Bay Project in the mid-1970s. No services whatsoever are available along this road with the exception of a 24-hour service station, complete with cafeteria and lodging, at kilometre 381. The road is fully paved, well maintained and ploughed during the winter, making Radisson accessible year-round. It is also accessible via La Grande Rivière Airport.

Climate

Demographics 

References

External links

Virtual tour of Radisson, photos (English)

Communities in Nord-du-Québec
Designated places in Quebec
James Bay Project
Unconstituted localities in Quebec